Piano Media was a SaaS company specializing in advanced media business processes and online commerce optimization software. Piano Media merged with competitor Tinypass on Aug. 11, 2015. With the merger and after acquiring US-based Press+ in Sept. 2014 from RR Donnelley & Sons, Piano became the largest provider of metered paywalls worldwide with more than 1200 news and media providers globally using their platforms. Founded in 2010 by Etarget & Monogram Ventures, in 2012 the company raised €2M in series B funding from 3TS Capital.

How the Piano Media Systems work
With the Aug. 2015 merger, Piano's clients will be moving to the Tinypass platform called VX, a stand-alone turnkey paywall solution used by magazines in the Time Inc. group, M. DuMont Schauberg and Canada's Postmedia Network. This solution is the most popular paywall being used by the newspaper industry today because it allows Piano and the publisher to collect user data to drive revenue.

As of March 2012, media earn monthly in average 1.1 eurocent per visitor.

According to Matus Kostolny, only unique content is locked and the rest is free, which enables newspapers to keep traffic on the website. SME.sk also restricted comments under articles to 3 comments per user and day for readers without Piano. A similar restriction was introduced in Pravda, but was later lifted.

History of Piano Media Systems

In September 2011 Piano received Series-A funding from Jan Jenča and Ivan Štefunko at Monogram Ventures. Piano is using the money to solidify their Slovak market share and expand into several other European countries.
In January 2012 Piano Media expanded into Slovenia, bringing seven publishers into the common payment system. In April 2012 Piano secured €2 million in a Series B growth capital round from 3TS Capital Partners’ Technology in Central and Eastern Europe Fund S.C.A. SICAR. Piano will use the money to accelerate their growth worldwide.

July 2012 Piano Media launched its third national payment system in Poland, teaming up with seven publishers who put more than 42 different magazines, newspapers and the national radio station in Piano's system.

In November 2012 Piano assumed all the rights and some developers from the Austrian firm Novosense.

Criticism

Piano has been criticized for manipulated numbers claimed during paidContent conference. Its CEO Tomáš Bella expressed hope, that 1% of Slovak internet population would become subscribers. Piano estimated in 2011 the Slovak internet population to be 2.3 million people, but Eurostat 2011 and AIMmonitor (a service of IAB Slovakia) estimate 3.3 and 2.8 million people respectively, many of them dissatisfied with the customer service provided.

In May 2014, Piano released subscriber and revenue details from the first three years of Slovak activity to refute claims by blogger Rastislav Kuciak, that according to public accounts summary, Piano has 3,800 to 5,400 subscribers, that is much less than official estimation of 20,000 subscribers. Piano's CEO Bella objected, stating Piano has more subscribers than guessed at by bloggers, but did not supply additional details. However Piano publicly released numbers in their 3rd year of operating a national paywall for the media in Slovakia:

Further reading

References

Providers of services to on-line companies
Mass media in Slovakia
Mass media in Poland
Mass media in Bratislava
Online companies of Slovakia